BunkFest, a small but growing end-of–summer folk music festival, takes place in Wallingford, Oxfordshire, UK and combines a broad range of folk music, dance displays, a beer festival and the local (Bunk) steam railway. BunkFest is a not-for-profit festival and is run entirely (apart from some technical services) by volunteers. BunkFest was started in 2002 by a small group of local folk music enthusiasts.

The festival is intended to appeal to a wide audience and should be thought of as a music festival with broad family appeal. The main stage features light music and dancing during the day and lively folk, folk-rock and world music acts in the evening. Other venues round the town feature a wide variety of acts ranging from quiet, contemplative folk artists and singer-songwriters to raucous rock bands.

The festival attracts between thirty and fifty dance sides. The dance programme varies from year to year, and has included, Cotswold and Border Morris, Appalachian and Eastern European forms, as well as traditional Irish, Scottish and Welsh forms.

BunkFest went on hiatus in 2020 & will return in 2021.

In 2022 BunkFest celebrated it 20th anniversary appreciating its roots starting out as a small marquee in a pub parking lot to the grand festival it is today.

Events
The festival centres on the Kinecroft, a five and a half acre open space enclosed by what are thought to be 9th century defensive walls, but involves performances in local pubs and other venues, with most free to attend.  The Cholsey and Wallingford Railway brings people from the main rail network at Cholsey. The festival includes performances on the train and on boats on the River Thames.  

There is an abundance of stage and music sights during the festival. There is a main stage line up in which in the 2022 festival featured many artists such as Geno Washington & The RamJam Band, The Blues Band, Rusty Snake, and many more artists throughout the three day festival. Additionally, there are Fringe performances  in which the music of BunkFest spreads beyond the main stage and into venues around its host town.

BunkFest hosts musical boat trips from the Riverside Park with live music being played on each boat.

BunkFest offers an exclusive "friend of BunkFest" evening for its adult participants. The "Friend of BunkFest" evening consists of a night of live music, complimentary food and adult beverages.

Performers
Headline performers have included Bellowhead, Eliza Carthy, Cara Dillon, Oysterband and Chumbawamba.

References

External links
Official Website

Music festivals established in 2002
Folk festivals in the United Kingdom
Music festivals in Oxfordshire